Anelosimus terraincognita is a species of spider discovered in the collection of the Rijksmuseum van Natuurlijke Historie, with no associated information as to its collector or location of discovery. Males have a corkscrew-shaped embolus, which is a characteristic unique to Australasian species within the genus Anelosimus. It is named for the cartographic Latin phrase terra incognita, meaning unknown land.

References

Theridiidae
Spiders described in 2012